In Concert is a live album by Christian singer Amy Grant, released in 1981 on Myrrh Records.

In Concert was the first album of a double live set, the other being In Concert Volume Two, which was released later that year. Although the two should have been issued as a double album, budget problems forced the two to be released separately. In Concert featured two new songs: "Mimi's House" and "Singing a Love Song", the latter became a Top Ten Christian radio hit. It was re-released in 2007 by Sparrow Records.

The album was nominated for Grammy Award for Best Gospel Performance, Contemporary.

Track listing

Personnel 

 Amy Grant – lead vocals
 Eddie DeGarmo – keyboards
 Gerry Peters – Oberheim synthesizer
 Dana Key – electric guitars, backing vocals
 Billy Sprague – acoustic guitars, backing vocals
 Mike Brignardello – bass guitar 
 Greg Morrow – drums
 David Durham – backing vocals
 Theresa Ellis – backing vocals
 Jan Harris – backing vocals
 Gary Pigg – backing vocals

Production
 Brown Bannister – producer, engineer, mixing
 Michael Blanton – executive producer
 Dan Harrell – executive producer
 Jack Joseph Puig – live recording engineer
 Malcom Harper – mobile recording
 Glenn Meadows – mastering
 Michael Harris Design – art direction, design 
 Wyatt Brown – cover photography

Charts

Weekly charts

Year-end charts

References 

Amy Grant live albums
Albums produced by Brown Bannister
1981 live albums
Myrrh Records albums